Uma Padmanabhan (born 27 September 1965 ) is an Indian film and television actress.

Career
Uma Padmanabhan had her early education in Chennai and graduated in commerce from SIET, Nandanam. When SUN TV was founded in 1993, she applied for the job of a compere in the channel. After serving as a news reader for a short time, Uma was chosen to host the program Vanakkam Tamizhagam. She later made her acting debut with the show Micro Thodar-Oru Kudumbam Oru Ragasiyam and also appeared in the shows Veetukku Veedu Looty, Oru Thaayin Sabatham, Chellame Chellam, Vinnaithaandi Varuvaayaa Poove Poochudava, Priyamanaval and  Chithi 2. Uma acted in more than 30 films in Tamil and Malayalam.

Filmography

Films

Television
Serials

Shows

Notes

References

External links

Living people
Indian socialites
Tamil television actresses
Actresses in Tamil cinema
Actresses in Malayalam cinema
20th-century Indian actresses
21st-century Indian actresses
Actresses from Chennai
Indian film actresses
Actresses in Tamil television
Actresses in Telugu cinema
1965 births